The 2023 Women's World Ice Hockey Championships will be the 25th such event hosted by the International Ice Hockey Federation. Teams will participate at several levels of competition. The competition will also serve as qualifications for the 2024 competition.

Championship (Top Division)

The tournament will be held in Brampton, Canada from 5 to 16 April 2023.

Teams

 – Promoted from the 2022 Division I A

Division I

Group A
The tournament was scheduled to be held in Shenzhen, China from 11 to 17 April 2023, but in March 2023 it was postponed.

Group B
The tournament will be held in Suwon, South Korea from 17 to 23 April 2023.

Division II

Group A
The tournament will be held in Mexico City, Mexico from 2 to 7 April 2023.

Group B
The tournament was held in Cape Town, South Africa from 20 to 26 February 2023.

Division III

Group A
The tournament will be held in Brașov, Romania from 3 to 9 April 2023.

Group B
The tournament will be held in Tnuvot, Israel from 26 to 31 March 2023.

References

External links
Official website

 
World Ice Hockey Championships - Women's
IIHF Women's World Ice Hockey Championships